The Hawthorn to Kew Rail Trail is a short rail trail following part of the former  Kew Branch Line in the inner suburbs of Melbourne, Victoria. The trail runs for less than a kilometre, through the L.E. Bray Reserve, between Hawthorn Grove and Chrystobel Crescent. A further short section of the alignment can be followed beside Hilda Crescent, through Grace Park where it previously joined the Belgrave/Lilydale line.

External links 
 Rail Trails Australia trail description

Rail trails in Victoria (Australia)